Thomas v. Review Board of the Indiana Employment Security Division, 450 U.S. 707 (1981), was a case in which the Supreme Court of the United States held that Indiana's denial of unemployment compensation benefits to petitioner violated his First Amendment right to free exercise of religion, under Sherbert v. Verner (1963).

Background 
Thomas, a Jehovah's Witness, was initially hired to work in his employer's roll foundry, which fabricated sheet steel for a variety of industrial uses, but when the foundry was closed, he was transferred to a department that fabricated turrets for military tanks. Since all of the employer's remaining departments were engaged directly in the production of weapons, petitioner asked to be laid off. When that request was denied, he quit, asserting that his religious beliefs prevented him from participating in the production of weapons. He was denied unemployment compensation benefits under the Indiana Employment Security Act.

Prior history 
At an administrative hearing, Thomas testified that he believed that contributing to the production of arms violated his religion, but he could, in good conscience, engage indirectly in the production of materials that might be used ultimately to fabricate arms. The hearing referee found that petitioner had terminated his employment because of his religious convictions but held that petitioner was not entitled to benefits because his voluntary termination was not based upon a "good cause [arising] in connection with [his] work," as required by the Indiana statute.

The Review Board of the Indiana Employment Security Division affirmed, but the Indiana Court of Appeals reversed, holding that the Indiana statute, as applied, improperly burdened petitioner's right to the free exercise of his religion. The Indiana Supreme Court vacated on petitioner's free exercise right, the burden justified by legitimate state interests.

Decision
The majority held that Indiana's denial of unemployment compensation violated Thomas' right to free exercise of religion.

See also
List of United States Supreme Court cases, volume 450

References

External links

United States Supreme Court cases
United States free exercise of religion case law
Jehovah's Witnesses litigation in the United States
1981 in United States case law
1981 in religion
United States Supreme Court cases of the Burger Court
Christianity and law in the 20th century